June Barbara Boyce-Tillman  (born 1943) is a prominent British academic specialising in music, spirituality and theology, particularly women's role in church music. She is Professor of Applied music at the University of Winchester and was ordained as a deacon of the Church of England in 2006 and as a priest in 2007.

Academic work
Boyce-Tillman read music at St Hugh's College, Oxford, before completing a Doctor of Philosophy (PhD) at the Institute of Education. Her doctorate on the development of children's musical creativity was widely published nationally and internationally. Much of her scholarship has become influential in music education research, especially her use of ideas of well-being, liminality, and ecology. Her work includes research on Hildegard of Bingen and many articles on interfaith dialogue. She is the founder of the Hildegard Network.

Performances and compositions

Boyce-Tillman has performed one-person shows combining music and story-telling across the world and is a composer of religious music. Her compositions and recordings include The Healing of The Earth (1997) and Hildegard of Bingen — A Life Apart (1996). In March 2008, she conducted the Southern Sinfonia at the Anvil concert hall in Basingstoke, for the premier of her new piece Step Into The Picture. This was a collaboration between the University of Winchester, Southern Sinfonia and Hampshire County Council.

She was appointed Member of the Order of the British Empire (MBE) in the 2008 Birthday Honours.

Selection of published works
 Unconventional Wisdom, 2007
 The Creative Spirit, 2000
 Constructing Musical Healing: The Wounds that Sing, 2000
 Singing the Mystery — Liturgical Pieces by Hildegard of Bingen, 1994
 In Praise of All-Encircling Love, 1992
 The Oxford Assembly Book, (Editor), 1990

References

External links
Boyce-Tillman's profile on Impulse-Music.com

Living people
Academics of the University of Winchester
Alumni of the UCL Institute of Education
Alumni of St Hugh's College, Oxford
British non-fiction writers
British composers
Members of the Order of the British Empire
1943 births
21st-century English Anglican priests